Lianbin Subdistrict is a subdistrict in Louxing District of Loudi City, Hunan Province, People's Republic of China.

Administrative division
The subdistrict is divided into 2 villages and 8 communities, the following areas: 
 Xianrenge Community
 Gaoche Community
 Taibao Community
 Chengqing Community
 Jiulun Community
 Minfu Community
 Xianrenqiao Community
 Maotang Community
 Xiping Village
 Guancao Village

Economy
The local economy is primarily based upon commerce and local industry.

The Loudi Economic and Technological Development Zone is located in the town.

Geography
Lianshui River, also known as the mother river, flows through the subdistrict.

Transportation

Provincial Highway
Provincial Highway S209 passes across the subdistrict north to south.

Railway
The Luoyang–Zhanjiang Railway, from Luoyang City, Henan Province to Zhanjiang City, Guangdong Province runs through the subdistrict.

Attractions
Chengqing Pagoda is a famous scenic spot in the subdistrict. It was originally built between 1899 and 1900 during the reign of Guangxu Emperor in the Qing dynasty. The  pagoda has the brick structure with three storeys and eight sides. In July 1995, it was designated as a municipal level cultural preservation unit.

References

External links

Divisions of Louxing District